Tackle is a playing position in gridiron football. Historically, in the one-platoon system prevalent in the late nineteenth and early twentieth centuries, a tackle played on both offense and defense. In the modern system of specialized units, offensive tackle and defensive tackle are separate positions, and the stand-alone term "tackle" refers to the offensive tackle position only. The offensive tackle (OT, T) is a position on the offensive line, left and right. Like other offensive linemen, their job is to block: to physically keep defenders away from the offensive player who has the football and enable him to advance the football and eventually score a touchdown. The term "tackle" is a vestige of an earlier era of football in which the same players played both offense and defense.

A tackle is the strong position on the offensive line. They power their blocks with quick steps and maneuverability. The tackles are mostly in charge of the outside protection. Usually they defend against defensive ends, but they do also have to defend against defensive tackles, especially if the corresponding guard on their side pulls.

According to Sports Illustrated football journalist Paul "Dr. Z" Zimmerman, offensive tackles consistently achieve the highest scores, relative to the other positional groups, on the Wonderlic Test, with an average of 26. The Wonderlic is taken before the draft to assess each player's aptitude for learning and problem solving.

The distinction between right and left tackle has become less relevant.

Right tackle
The right tackle (RT) is usually one of the team's best run blockers. Most running plays are towards the strong side (the side with the tight end) of the offensive line. Consequently, the right tackle will face the defending team's best run stoppers. He must be able to gain traction in his blocks so that the running back can find a hole to run through.

Left tackle
The left tackle (LT) is usually the team's best pass blocker. Of the two tackles, the left tackles will often have better footwork and agility than the right tackle in order to counteract the pass rush of defensive ends. When a quarterback throws a forward pass, the quarterback's shoulders are aligned roughly perpendicular to the line of scrimmage, with the non-dominant shoulder closer to downfield.  Right-handed quarterbacks, the majority of players in the position, thus turn their backs to defenders coming from the left side, creating a vulnerable "blind side" that the left tackle must protect. (Conversely, teams with left-handed quarterbacks tend to have their better pass blockers at right tackle for the same reason.)

A 2006 book by Michael Lewis, The Blind Side: Evolution of a Game, made into a 2009 motion picture, shed light on the workings of the left tackle position. The book and the film's introduction discuss how the annual salary of left tackles in the NFL skyrocketed in the mid-1990s. Premier left tackles are now highly sought after and are often the second highest paid players on a roster after the quarterback; in the 2013 NFL Draft three of the first four picks were left tackles, and usually at least one left tackle is picked in the first five positions. Recent examples include Eric Fisher (2013, 1st overall pick), Luke Joeckel (2013, 2nd overall pick), Lane Johnson (2013, 4th overall pick), Matt Kalil (2012, 4th overall pick), Trent Williams (2010, 4th overall pick), Jake Long (2008, 1st overall pick), and Joe Thomas (2007, 3rd overall pick).

References

American football offensive linemen
American football positions